Malay , officially the Municipality of Malay (Aklanon: Banwa it Malay; Hiligaynon: Banwa sang Malay), is a 1st class cosmopolitan municipality in the province of Aklan, Philippines. It is the richest municipality in the province in terms of revenue. According to the 2020 census, it has a population of 60,077 people making it the second most populated town in Aklan.

It is the northernmost town in the island of Panay and the youngest amongst all municipalities in Aklan province. The resort island of Boracay is part of the municipality.

History
The municipality of Malay was created on June 15, 1949, through Republic Act No. 381 and the help of Claro Tumaob, out of various portions of the municipality of Buruanga, then part of Capiz. It included the following barangays: Malay (poblacion, seat of local government), Dumlog, Cabulihan, Balusbos, Nabaoy, Cubay Norte, Cubay Sur, Cogon, Argao, Sambiray, Caticlan, Manoc-Manoc, Balabag, Yapak, Motag, Napaan, and Naasog. On April 25, 1956, Malay became part of the newly-created province of Aklan, along with several other towns of Capiz.

It was hit severely by typhoon Seniang on December 9–10, 2006, with much destruction and damage of homes and infrastructure.

Cityhood
"Resolution no. 066, series of 2010" created an ad hoc Committee and Technical Working Group to conduct initial study and evaluation for the proposed cityhood of the Municipality of Malay, Aklan.

In 2021, the Aklan Provincial Board passed a resolution urging legislative action to change the local government classification of Malay from first-class municipality to chartered city. On November 28, 2022, House Bill No. 6401 was filed by Rep Teodorico Haresco Jr which seeks accomplish this.

Geography

According to the Philippine Statistics Authority, the municipality has a land area of  constituting  of the  total area of Aklan.

Climate

Barangays
Malay is politically subdivided into 17 barangays,  three (Balabag, Manoc-Manoc, and Yapak) of which are situated within Boracay Island, while the rest are in mainland Malay.

Demographics

In the 2020 census, Malay had a population of 60,077.

Economy

Because of its robust tourism industry, the municipality is now considered as having the strongest economy in all the municipalities in the Region and the richest municipality of Aklan in terms of income and annual budget. The tourism industry of Boracay became the catalyst of its economic growth that brought many investors to come and helped transform the municipality into a cosmopolitan area.

Banks
, there are ten (10) banks in the municipality of Malay operated by six (6) commercial banking corporations.

Transportation

Air

Malay has one airport, officially named Godofredo P. Ramos Airport but more popularly known as Caticlan Airport. Only small aircraft were allowed to land on the  runway.

Sea

The Caticlan Jetty Port, one of the ports along the Strong Republic Nautical Highway, serves as a gateway to Boracay island, Roxas, Oriental Mindoro, and Bulalacao, Oriental Mindoro.

Education
List of schools in Malay

Secondary 
 Boracay National High School
 Boracay National High School Manoc-Manoc Extension
 Caticlan Academy Foundation, Inc
 Lamberto H. Tirol National High School
 Malay National High School

Healthcare
Malay is being served by three hospitals, of which 1 is private, and 2 are owned by the government.
 Don Ciriaco Tirol Memorial Hospital
 Malay Municipal Hospital
 Aklan Baptist Hospital

References

External links

 [ Philippine Standard Geographic Code]
 www.CaticlanAcademy.org

 
Municipalities of Aklan
Port cities and towns in the Philippines